Giannis Fysekis (born 10 October 1985) is a Greek professional footballer who plays as a goalkeeper for Ginásio Clube Alcobaça.

Career
Fysekis has been playing in the lower divisions of Greek football with P.A.O.N.E. since June 2010. From January through June 2010, he played for Greek second division side Panserraikos F.C. Before that, he had played for P.A.O.N.E. in the Greek Gamma Ethniki.

For the 2007–08 season, Fysekis was loaned out by AEK Athens F.C. to the Greek Third Division club, Anagennisi Karditsa, and then to the Greek Third Division Club, PAE AS Lamia. He was later loaned out to Apollon Kalamarias F.C. during the 2008–09 season.

On 16 June 2009, Giannnis Fysekis' contract with AEK was terminated

References
3. http://www.arisfc.gr/gr/%CE%BF-%CF%86%CF%85%CF%83%CE%AD%CE%BA%CE%B7%CF%82-%CF%83%CF%84%CE%BF%CE%BD-%CE%B1%CF%81%CE%B7.html

1985 births
Living people
Greek footballers
Association football goalkeepers
AEK Athens F.C. players
Apollon Pontou FC players
Panserraikos F.C. players
Footballers from Thessaloniki